Otothyropsis biamnicus is a species of catfish in the family Loricariidae. It is native to South America, where it occurs in tributaries of the Iguazu River and the Tibagi River, which are both in the Paraná River basin of Brazil. It is noted to be commensal with midge larvae of the family Chironomidae, which attach to the gill openings or more rarely the cleithrum of the fish. It reaches 4 cm (1.6 inches) SL. The specific epithet of this species, biamnicus, roughly translates to "inhabitant of two rivers", which refers to the species' distribution in tributaries of two different rivers.

References 

Loricariidae
Otothyrinae
Fish described in 2013